Pieter De Bruyne (Aalst, Belgium, 1931 - 1987) was a Flemish artist, designer and interior architect.

Life
In 1953, De Bruyne graduated as an interior architect at the Sint-Lucas School in Brussels. In 1955–56 and 1957, he participated in the salons of modern social furniture in Ghent, and in 1958, he received the “Golden Mark”. At this time, De Bruyne also did an internship at Studio Giò Ponti in Milan. In 1959, he received an honourable mention in the international furniture competition of Cantù. In 1960, De Bruyne won a prize with chair designs in the European  Arflex - Domus (magazine) competition in Milan. In 1961, he won another prize at Cantù with a dining room design. He held exhibitions in Belgium and abroad and took on the most diverse assignments.

De Bruyne taught at the St.-Lukas Institute in Schaarbeek, and received a state prize in 1984 for his artistic career. The entire archive of his work is owned by the  Design Museum Gent.

Work
On the occasion of an exhibit in the Saint Peter’s Abbey in Ghent in 1976, Jan Pieter Ballegeer writes: “But what is the message of De Bruyne’s furniture? There is, first and foremost, an attack of sorts on the familiar itself, an annihilation, if you will, of the common. There is a distortion of objects as one sees in dadaism, surrealism and pop-art. However, De Bruyne’s deformation is not characteristically expressionistic, not mainly meant to be understood immediately, but rather delicately mysterious and complexly aesthetic, ingeniously manneristic. The designer’s artistic self-awareness lends to his furniture a remarkable monumentality? Their nature almost demands that they not be placed against walls or in corners, but that they stand free in space, like sculptures.

Pioneer of the postmodern
De Bruyne’s projects from the period 1970–1987 should definitely be linked to the postmodern  school in architecture and design. The best-known designers in this respect are Studio Alchimia and the Memphis Group (Alessandro Mendini, A. Branzi, Ettore Sottsass). The many traits in common with the postmodern Italians should not obscure the fact that De Bruyne had already started this type of work in 1970, whereas Studio Alchimia and the Memphis Group only developed their activities a decade later. This is exactly why some call De Bruyne a precursor of postmodern furniture.

Chantilly cabinet
De Bruyne was paid hommage in the exhibition “Postmodernism, style and subversion 1970–1990” in the London Victoria and Albert Museum  (2011–2012), where his Chantilly cabinet (1975) took up a prominent place.

Egypt
In 1974, a special interest in Egypt takes hold. De Bruyne looks into the meaning of Egyptian contributions to furniture history. Like a scientist, De Bruyne collects data about the Egyptian furniture piece, analyses and compares it. A decade worth of numerous measurements results in hundreds of drawings about the structure of the Egyptian furniture. Based on these drawings, he makes mathematical and structural analyses. In 1985, De Bruyne comes up with spectacular results: he supposedly found the key to the secret canon and deciphered the underlying laws of Egyptian furniture, painting and sculpture. Moreover, his findings would serve as a basis for the understanding of Egyptian pyramids from a rational and mathematical perspective. De Bruyne plans a book with the results of his studies by the end of 1985, but finds some obstacles in his way that complicate the completion of his work. In February 1987, De Bruyne passes away. In 1982, he used the Egyptian measuring system in his own designs. By the end of his career, he would apply the entire canon to his work.

Furniture and objects
Pieter De Bruyne designed an unprecedented number of furniture pieces and objects, over 200 of which were realised. De Bruyne also designed more than 175 interiors and architectural projects. De Bruyne designed also 5 chandeliers for Arteluce (Gino Sarfatti) and Stilnovo.
De Bruyne's furniture has been exhibited both at home and abroad, including Los Angeles, London, Mainz, Zurich, Bari and Amsterdam. In 2022, De Bruyne made its debut at the art and design fair PAD Paris.

Pieter De Bruyne residence

In 1972, he renovated a neoclassicistic townhouse in Aalst, turning it into a work residence. In 2008 the building was protected as monument. The designer named several rooms after a special colour, which then defined its decoration, like the blue room.

Van Schuylenbergh residence
In 1979-1986, Pieter De Bruyne delivers his final masterpiece. A townhouse in Aalst near Brussels. In 2021 the building and its entire interior were protected as monument by the flemish minister Matthias Diependaele.
In 2022, the property received national and international attention with the publication of an article in the specialised magazines Interior Design(US) and the German Häuser. Earlier, an article also appeared in heritage magazine Monumentaal(NL).

Bibliography

Schofield, M., (red.) (1978) Decorative Art and Modern Interiors 1978, Volume 67, London, New York, 38-45. 
Kieckens, Christian & Storgaard, Eva :Pieter De Bruyne - Pionier van het postmoderne, Uitg Academic & Scientific Publischers, Brussel, 
Gillo Dorfles "I Mobili simbolici di Pieter De Bruyne", Domus 668, gennaio 1986, 72-73.
Sven-Claude Bettinger, "Pieter De Bruyne, Möbel-Plastiken und Interieurs für Ästheten", Raum, n°8 1983, 2-6.
Stefano Casciani, "Per una poetica industriale", Casa Vogue n°171 1986, 150-151.
Bekkers, L., (1988) Pieter De Bruyne, de ontwerper als kunstenaar, Ons Erfdeel 31.2 (maart-april), 175-181.
Daenens, L., Defour, F., (1991) Meubeldesign en kunst. Pieter De Bruyne, Frans Van Praet, Emile Veranneman, Brussel, Gemeentekrediet, 29-45.
Dufour, Frans. Belgische meubelkunst in de XXe eeuw, van Horta tot heden, Uitg Lannoo, Tielt, ISBN D19794556
Kieckens, C., (2000) De meubelkunst van Pieter De Bruyne, onuitgegeven nota.
Norberg-Schulz, C., en Vanderperren, J., (1980) Pieter De Bruyne 25 jaar Meubels, Gent.
Valcke, J., (1987) Naar de essentie van het meubel, Belgisch kreatief ambacht 23.3, 3-10.

References

20th-century Belgian architects
Belgian interior designers
Belgian furniture designers
Belgian architects
People from Aalst, Belgium
1931 births
1987 deaths